BBC Radio 1's Live Lounge 2016 is a compilation album consisting of live tracks played on Clara Amfo's BBC Radio 1 show, both cover versions and original songs. The album was released on 11 November 2016, and is the twelfth in the series of Live Lounge albums. It debuted on the iTunes UK chart at #6 and reached #2. One reviewer said "As always with every Live Lounge collection, the best you can hope for is a mixed bag."

Track listing

References 

2016 compilation albums
2016 live albums
Live Lounge
Covers albums
Rhino Entertainment compilation albums
Sony Music compilation albums
Universal Music Group compilation albums
Universal Music TV albums